Shalom Yosef Shapira, known by the pen name 
Shin Shalom (19 December 1904 – 2 March 1990; Hebrew: ש. שלום), was an Israeli poet, author and translator. His poetry is known for elements derived form Hasidic and Kabbalah symbolism.

In 1973, Shalom was awarded the Israel Prize for poetry. He is also known for having translated all of Shakespeare's sonnets into Hebrew, a feat for which he was awarded the Tchernichovsky Prize. He was also the recipient of the Bialik Prize in 1941 and the Brenner Prize in 1949.

References
Catalogue of Sin Shalom published works (Hebrew), featured on the website of the National Library of Israel.

1904 births
1990 deaths
Israeli male poets
20th-century Israeli poets